Kozare may refer to:

Kozare, Albania, a municipality in central Albania
Kozare, Bulgaria, a village in southeast Bulgaria
Kozare (Leskovac), a village in southern Serbia

See also
Kozara (disambiguation)